Pentre Gwynfryn is a village in the Ardudwy area of Gwynedd, Wales about  east of Llanbedr and the community of the same name. The village is at the confluence of the River Artro and the River Cwmnantcol.

The inside of Capel Salem at Pentre Gwynfryn was made famous by the painter Sydney Curnow Vosper (1866–1942) who painted the 1908 Salem featuring a member of the congregation, Siân Owen, in traditional Welsh costume. The folds around the left arm of her richly embroidered cloak are said to form the face of the devil who has taken over this proud woman, although this can be difficult to see. A far more obvious devil's face may be seen peering in through the window, which may be the origin of the claim that the devil's face is in the picture. The Salem painting hangs in the Lady Lever Art Gallery at Port Sunlight on the Wirral.

External links

Salem Chapel at the Lady Lever Gallery
www.geograph.co.uk : photos of Pentre Gwynfryn and surrounding area

Llanbedr
Villages in Gwynedd
Villages in Snowdonia